In human anatomy, the abdominal aorta is the largest artery in the abdominal cavity.  As part of the aorta, it is a direct continuation of the descending aorta (of the thorax).

Structure
The abdominal aorta begins at the level of the diaphragm, crossing it via the aortic hiatus, technically behind the diaphragm, at the vertebral level of T12. It travels down the posterior wall of the abdomen, anterior to the vertebral column.  It thus follows the curvature of the lumbar vertebrae, that is, convex anteriorly.  The peak of this convexity is at the level of the third lumbar vertebra (L3).
It runs parallel to the inferior vena cava, which is located just to the right of the abdominal aorta, and becomes smaller in diameter as it gives off branches. This is thought to be due to the large size of its principal branches. At the 11th rib, the diameter is 122mm long and 55mm wide and this is because of the constant pressure. The abdominal aorta is clinically divided into 2 segments:
 The suprarenal abdominal or paravisceral segment, inferior to the diaphragm but superior to the renal arteries.
 The Infrarenal segment, inferior to the renal arteries and superior to the iliac bifurcation.

Branches

The abdominal aorta supplies blood to much of the abdominal cavity. It begins at T12 and ends at L4 with its bifurcation into the common iliac arteries and usually has the following branches:

Note that the bifurcation (union) of the inferior vena cava is at L5 and therefore below that of the bifurcation of the aorta.

 inferior phrenic a.
 celiac a.
 left gastric a.
 splenic a.
 short gastric arteries (6)
 splenic arteries (6)
 left gastroepiploic a.
 pancreatic arteries
 common hepatic a.
 right gastric a.
 gastroduodenal a.
 right gastroepiploic a.
 superior pancreaticoduodenal a.
 right hepatic a.
 cystic a.
 left hepatic a.
 superior mesenteric a.
 inferior pancreaticoduodenal a.
 jejunal and ileal arteries
 middle colic a.
 right colic a.
 ileocolic a
 anterior cecal a.
 posterior cecal a. – appendicular a.
 ileal a.
 colic a.
 middle suprarenal a.
 renal a.
 testicular or ovarian a.
 four lumbar arteries
 inferior mesenteric a.
 left colic a.
 sigmoid arteries (2 or 3)
 superior rectal a.
 median sacral a.
 common iliac a.
 external iliac a.
 internal iliac a.

Relations
The abdominal aorta lies slightly to the left of the midline of the body. It is covered, anteriorly, by the lesser omentum and stomach, behind which are the branches of the celiac artery and the celiac plexus; below these, by the lienal vein (splenic vein), are the pancreas, the left renal vein, the inferior part of the duodenum, the mesentery, and the aortic plexus.

Posteriorly, it is separated from the lumbar vertebrae and intervertebral fibrocartilages by the anterior longitudinal ligament and left lumbar veins.

On the right side it is in relation above with the azygos vein, cisterna chyli, thoracic duct, and the right crus of the diaphragm—the last separating it from the upper part of the inferior vena cava, and from the right celiac ganglion; the inferior vena cava is in contact with the aorta below.

On the left side are the left crus of the diaphragm, the left celiac ganglion, the ascending part of the duodenum, and some coils of the small intestine.

Relationship with inferior vena cava
The abdominal aorta's venous counterpart, the inferior vena cava (IVC), travels parallel to it on its right side.
 Above the level of the umbilicus, the aorta is somewhat posterior to the IVC, sending the right renal artery travelling behind it.  The IVC likewise sends its opposite side counterpart, the left renal vein, crossing in front of the aorta.
 Below the level of the umbilicus, the situation is generally reversed, with the aorta sending its right common iliac artery to cross its opposite side counterpart (the left common iliac vein) anteriorly.

Collateral circulation
The collateral circulation would be carried on by the anastomoses between the internal thoracic artery and the inferior epigastric artery; by the free communication between the superior and inferior mesenterics, if the ligature were placed between these vessels; or by the anastomosis between the inferior mesenteric artery and the internal pudendal artery, when (as is more common) the point of ligature is below the origin of the inferior mesenteric artery; and possibly by the anastomoses of the lumbar arteries with the branches of the internal iliac artery.

Clinical significance

Aneurysm

Additional images

See also
 Cardiovascular system
 Nutcracker syndrome
 Aortocaval compression syndrome

References

External links
 UCC

Arteries of the abdomen
Aorta